Carlos Alberto Gomes Kao Yien, commonly known as China (born December 9, 1964), is a retired Brazilian footballer who played as a right back for several Série A clubs.

Career
Born in Vitória, China started his career in 1983 with Rio Branco, playing four Série A games and winning the Campeonato Capixaba before being loaned to Brasília in 1985. With Brasília he played 16 games and scored three goals. He returned to Rio Branco in 1985, winning the Campeonato Capixaba again, and playing 16 Série A games and scoring two goals before leaving the club in 1988. China joined Inter de Limeira in 1989, playing 17 Série A games and scoring two goals for the club. He played 23 Série A games and scored two goals for Grêmio between 1990 and 1991. With Botafogo, China played five Série A games in 1993, and was part of the squad that won that edition of the Copa CONMEBOL. He defended Linhares from 1994 to 1996, winning the Campeonato Capixaba in 1995, and Avaí in 1999, before retiring.

Honors
 Botafogo
Copa CONMEBOL: 1993
 Linhares
Campeonato Capixaba: 1995
 Rio Branco
Campeonato Capixaba: 1983, 1985

References

1964 births
People from Vitória, Espírito Santo
Living people
Association football defenders
Brazilian sportspeople of Chinese descent
Brazilian footballers
Brazilian football managers
Rio Branco Atlético Clube players
Brasília Futebol Clube players
Associação Atlética Internacional (Limeira) players
Grêmio Foot-Ball Porto Alegrense players
Botafogo de Futebol e Regatas players
Linhares Esporte Clube players
Avaí FC players
Desportiva Ferroviária managers
Sportspeople from Espírito Santo